The Imo River (Igbo:Imo) is in southeastern Nigeria and flows  into the Atlantic Ocean. In Akwa Ibom State, the river is known as Imoh River, that is, Inyang Imoh, which translates to River of Wealth (Ibibio: Inyang means River or Ocean, and Imoh means Wealth). The Imo's tributary Rivers are the Otamiri and Oramirukwa. The Imo was cleared under the British colonial administration of Nigeria in 1907–1908 and 1911; first to Aba and then to Udo near Umuahia.

The deity, or Alusi of the river is the female Imo who communities surrounding the river believe to be the owner of the river. Mmiri in Igbo language means water or rain.   A festival for the Alusi is held annually between May and July. The Imo River features an  bridge at the crossing between Rivers State and Akwa Ibom State.

References

Rivers of Nigeria
Imo State